The Australasian Intervarsity Debating Championships (known colloquially as "Australs") is an annual debating tournament for teams from universities in the Australasian region. It is one of the world's largest debating tournaments, second only in size to the World Universities Debating Championship (WUDC), the European Universities Debating Championships (EUDC) and one of the largest annual student events in the world. Australs follows the Australia-Asian Debating format (three speakers plus replies), rather than the British Parliamentary Style used at WUDC. It is held every year in early-July under the auspices of the Australasian Intervarsity Debating Association (AIDA). The host university is selected a year before at a meeting of the Council of the Australasian Intervarsity Debating Association.

The best speaker of the tournament is awarded the "Martin Sorensen Trophy", and the best speaker of the Grand Final is awarded the "Jock Fanselow Cup".

The most recent edition of Australs was held by the Western Sydney Debating Union. The tournament was held online although is referred to as 'Campbelltown Australs' in recognition of the hosts' location. The current champions are William Price, Charlie Ryan and Sam Trotter of the University of Sydney Union.

History 

Since the inaugural tournament at the University of Sydney in 1975, Australs has continually expanded the scope of its participants, now attracting around 300 competitors each year from around the Asia-Pacific region. Australs was significantly modernised in 1993 when a new constitution was introduced by then AIDA President.  The Constitution provided for standard rules of debate and adjudication, and provided for extended voting rights for non-Australian and New Zealand participants. Currently teams come from Australia, Bangladesh, China, Hong Kong, India, Indonesia, Japan, Malaysia, New Zealand, Pakistan, Singapore, South Korea, Thailand, Russia and the Philippines.

Prior to the inception of the AIDA in 1990, there were occasional problems with the administration and rule-format for Australs, as the running of the tournament was left to the host university, with a meeting of all Universities at the end of the competition.  There was little ongoing supervision of the hosts, and adjudication standards varied widely.

Gender and Diversity 

In 1992 an affirmative action requirement was introduced to ensure that at least one third of each University's contingent must be female, unless the circumstances could be justified. This was prompted by the poor representation of female debaters at Australs. In 1990 only 8% of all speakers eligible to make the finals at Australasian championships were female, although women were over-represented as adjudicators. In 1991, the year before the introduction of the affirmative action requirement, the first women's meeting was held to discuss ways to combat the problem. At that time the participation rate had risen to 21%, with the introduction of a number of universities as first-time participants. Few women were represented in the finals, however. The intention behind the introduction of the rule was that it would encourage universities to promote debating to a large number of potential members and train their debaters before they attended Australs. It was also thought that this would encourage a greater diversity of speaking styles, rather than what was seen as a very aggressive style by a number of very successful and talented Australian male debaters, and this would benefit all debaters and universities.

Past champions and hosts

Awards and Prizes

Martin Sorensen Trophy
The 'Martin Sorensen Trophy' is awarded to the best speaker of the tournament.

A prize recognising the tournament's best speaker was first awarded in 1989, however in 1994, it was renamed the Martin Sorensen Trophy in honour of the outstanding Monash University debater who died in July 1993 – only days after winning the award for the second time in a row.

Sorensen was considered to be the finest debater of his generation. In addition to being awarded the Best Speaker prize twice, he won the tournament twice, was a runner-up once, and was selected in the Australian Test team 3 years in a row. After his death, it was decided that the Best Speaker award would be named in Sorensen's honour to preserve his memory, and it is common for Australs debaters to be educated about his legacy even now, 20 years after his death.

The Trophy is awarded to the debater with the highest total sum of speaker scores in the preliminary rounds of competition. It is considered to be the most prestigious individual award in Australasian debating.

Jock Fanselow Cup
The best speaker in the Grand Final is awarded the 'Jock Fanselow Cup.'

Jock Fanselow was a debating legend in New Zealand and Australasia. Representing Victoria University, he won Australs in 1980, 
and 1982 – the first person to win Australs twice. He was best speaker in the Grand Final of both years. Unfortunately, ill health plagued Jock since birth and a suppressed immune system saw him contract a virus which led to his death in January 2006 at the age of 48. Jock's debating teammates, friends, and family donated a cup in his name and it was first presented at Australs 2006, held at Jock's home university, Victoria University of Wellington.

Boby Andika Ruitang Memorial Trophy 
The best ESL speaker of the tournament is awarded the 'Boby Andika Ruitang Memorial Trohpy'. 

The trophy was introduced after Boby's passing in 2021 to commemorate their exceptional contribution to debate in Asia and support of ESL speakers in global debating.

Best EFL speaker

Best reply speaker

See also
 World Universities Debating Championship
 European Universities Debating Championship
 North American Debating Championship
 United Asian Debating Championships

References

External links
2011 Australasian Intervarsity Debating Championships website
2010 Australasian Intervarsity Debating Championships website
World Debate Website page on the Australasian Intervarsity Debating Championships

Australasian debating competitions